The Hollywood Ten is a 1950 American 16mm short documentary film. In the film, each member of the Hollywood Ten made a short speech denouncing McCarthyism and the Hollywood blacklisting.

The film was directed by John Berry. After being named a communist by fellow director and former party member Edward Dmytryk, one of the Hollywood Ten, and by ex-Communist Party member Frank Tuttle, Berry was unable to find work again in Hollywood after 1951, and left for France.

The documentary is available on the DVD releases of Spartacus and Salt of the Earth.

Featuring
 Alvah Bessie
 Herbert J. Biberman
 Lester Cole
 Edward Dmytryk
 Ring Lardner Jr.
 John Howard Lawson
 Albert Maltz
 Samuel Ornitz
 Adrian Scott
 Dalton Trumbo

Release
The Hollywood Ten was shown at the Museum of Modern Art in New York City as a part of the "Carte Blanche" series.

References

Further reading
 Caballero, Raymond. McCarthyism vs. Clinton Jencks. Norman: University of Oklahoma Press, 2019.

External links
 
 The Hollywood Ten bios at University of California, Berkeley, Library
 John Berry's obituary in The Philadelphia Inquirer
 
 

1950 films
1950 documentary films
Black-and-white documentary films
Documentary films about American politics
Films directed by John Berry
Films about the Hollywood blacklist
American independent films
McCarthyism
American short documentary films
American black-and-white films
1950s English-language films
1950s American films